"Fully Alive" is a song by American band Flyleaf. In November 2006, it was released as the second single from their debut album Flyleaf (2005). It is the third song of the band to have a music video which features the radio-edit instead of the album version.

Background

After the joint venture of A&M records and Octone Records, the debut album Flyleaf contains the radio-edit version of the song, replacing the album version. For unknown reasons, the music video features the radio edit instead of the album version. The radio-edit contains a variation of the guitar solo heard in the album version along with extra lyrics.

Track listing

Charts

References 

2006 singles
Flyleaf (band) songs
2005 songs
Song recordings produced by Howard Benson
A&M Octone Records singles